Golam Mohammad Siraj (born 15 January 1950), known as GM Siraj, is a Bangladesh Nationalist Party politician. He served as a Jatiya Sangsad member representing the Bogra-5 and Bogra-6 constituencies He resigned from the latest position on 11 December 2022.

Career
Siraj is an elected to parliament from Bogra-6 of 11th Parliament and from Bogura-5 as a Bangladesh Nationalist Party with in total 5 times MP. He is also the chairman of SR group.

References 

Living people
1950 births
People from Bogra District
Bangladesh Nationalist Party politicians
11th Jatiya Sangsad members
10th Jatiya Sangsad members
8th Jatiya Sangsad members
7th Jatiya Sangsad members
6th Jatiya Sangsad members
5th Jatiya Sangsad members